Jeong-ho, Jung-ho, or Jong-ho is a Korean masculine given name. The meaning differs based on the hanja used to write each syllable of the name. There are 75 hanja with the reading "jeong" and 49 hanja with the reading "ho" on the South Korean government's official list of hanja which may be used in given names. Jung-ho was a popular name for baby boys in South Korea in the mid-20th century, coming in fifth place in 1950, rising to fourth place in 1960, and falling to seventh place in 1970.

People with this name include:
Kim Jeong-ho (1804–1866?), Joseon Dynasty geographer and cartographer
Jung-Ho Pak (born 1962), American symphony conductor
Hong Jeong-ho (born 1974), South Korean handball player
Lee Jung-ho (born 1981), South Korean football player
Kang Jung-ho (born 1987), South Korean baseball player
Hong Jeong-ho (born 1989), South Korean football player

See also
List of Korean given names

References

Korean masculine given names